The following are the statistics of the Turkish First Football League in season 1991/1992.

Overview
It was contested by 16 teams, and Beşiktaş J.K. won the championship. This is the only season in the Turkish League, when a team has won the championship without a loss.

League table

Galatasaray qualified to UEFA following the Albanian renounce.

Results

Top scorers

References

Turkey - List of final tables (RSSSF)

Süper Lig seasons
1991–92 in Turkish football
Turkey